Ricardo Espinoza was a Peruvian politician in the early 20th century. He was the mayor of Lima in 1920.

Mayors of Lima
Year of birth missing
Year of death missing